Dmytro Oleksandrovych Yusov (born 11 May 1993) is a Ukrainian professional footballer who plays as a midfielder for Chornomorets Odesa.

Career
Yusov is a product of th FC Metalurh Zaporizhzhia youth system. Made his debut for FC Metalurh entering as a second-half substitute against FC Vorskla Poltava on 4 May 2013 in Ukrainian Premier League.

References

External links
 
 
 

1993 births
Living people
People from Melitopol
Ukrainian footballers
Association football midfielders
Ukrainian expatriate footballers
Expatriate footballers in Belarus
Ukrainian expatriate sportspeople in Belarus
Expatriate footballers in Moldova
Ukrainian expatriate sportspeople in Moldova
Ukrainian Premier League players
Ukrainian Second League players
FC Metalurh Zaporizhzhia players
FC Metalurh-2 Zaporizhzhia players
FC Granit Mikashevichi players
FC Dacia Chișinău players
FC Slutsk players
FC Torpedo-BelAZ Zhodino players
FC Isloch Minsk Raion players
FC BATE Borisov players
FC Chornomorets Odesa players
Ukraine under-21 international footballers
Sportspeople from Zaporizhzhia Oblast